Voat Kor is a khum (commune) of Battambang District in Battambang Province in north-western Cambodia. It is the birthplace of Nuon Chea, one of the leaders of the Khmer Rouge.

Villages

 Voat Kor
 Chrab Krasang
 Ballang
 Khsach Pouy
 Damnak Luong
 Kampong Seima

References

Communes of Battambang province
Battambang District